John Phil Gilbert (born 1949) is a senior United States district judge of the United States District Court for the Southern District of Illinois.

Education and career

Born in Carbondale, Illinois, Gilbert received a Bachelor of Science degree from the University of Illinois at Urbana–Champaign in 1971 and a Juris Doctor from Loyola University Chicago School of Law in 1974. Gilbert practiced privately in Carbondale from 1974 to 1988, also serving as a special assistant attorney general of Public Aid Enforcement Division from 1974 to 1975, as an assistant city attorney of the City of Carbondale from 1975 to 1978, and as a member of the Illinois State Board of Elections from 1978 to 1988, serving as Chairman from 1981 to 1983 and as Vice-Chairman from 1983 to 1985. Gilbert was a circuit judge, First Judicial Circuit of Illinois, from 1988 to 1992.

Federal judicial service

On July 2, 1992, Gilbert was nominated by President George H. W. Bush to a seat on the United States District Court for the Southern District of Illinois vacated by Judge James L. Foreman. Gilbert was confirmed by the United States Senate on September 23, 1992, and was commissioned on September 24, 1992. He served as Chief Judge from 1993 to 2000. He assumed senior status on March 15, 2014.

Complaints

In 2016 a lawyer in Illinois filed a complaint under the Judicial Conduct and Disability Act of 1980, contending that Judge Gilbert's service on Southern Illinois University's Board of Trustees violates the Code of Conduct for United States Judges, in particular Canon 4B(1) which provides that a judge should not serve on an organization if that organization is regularly involved in litigation before him or his colleagues. Chief Judge Diane P. Wood agreed but because Gilbert did not a Special Committee was appointed to investigate the complaint pursuant to Rule 11(f) of the Rules for Judicial-Conduct and Judicial-Disability Proceedings. He agreed not to take cases involving Illinois state employees and Committee accepted that as an offer of "corrective action," which the Committee believed was "appropriate."

In 2017, Gilbert had further controversy when it was discovered that his representative during his ethics hearing was former U.S. district judge Patrick Murphy, a common ally of environmental litigator Stephen Tillery, but it was not disclosed in court records. Murphy then appeared as a litigator for Tillery in the court of Gilbert but it was not until five days later that Gilbert disclosed he had been a client.

References

Sources
 

1949 births
Living people
Illinois state court judges
Judges of the United States District Court for the Southern District of Illinois
United States district court judges appointed by George H. W. Bush
20th-century American judges
Loyola University Chicago School of Law alumni
People from Carbondale, Illinois
21st-century American judges